Iosif Demian (born 26 May 1941) is a Romanian cinematographer and film director. His 1980 film A Girl's Tears was screened in the Un Certain Regard section at the 1982 Cannes Film Festival.

Selected filmography
 A Girl's Tears (1980)

References

External links

1941 births
Living people
Romanian cinematographers
Romanian film directors